Saint Maurice (also Moritz, Morris, or Mauritius) was an Egyptian military leader who headed the legendary Theban Legion of Rome in the 3rd century, and is one of the favorite and most widely venerated saints of that martyred group. He is the patron saint of several professions, locales, and kingdoms.

Biography

Early life
According to the hagiographical material, Maurice was an Egyptian, born in AD 250 in Thebes, an ancient city in Upper Egypt that was the capital of the New Kingdom of Egypt (1575-1069 BC). He was brought up in the region of Thebes (Luxor).

Career
Maurice became a soldier in the Roman army. He rose through the ranks until he became the commander of the Theban legion, thus leading approximately a thousand men. He was an acknowledged Christian at a time when early Christianity was considered to be a threat to the Roman Empire.

The legion, entirely composed of Christians, had been called from Thebes in Egypt to Gaul to assist Emperor Maximian in defeating a revolt by the bagaudae. The Theban Legion was dispatched with orders to clear the Great St Bernard Pass across the Alps. Before going into battle, they were instructed to offer sacrifices to the pagan gods and pay homage to the emperor. Maurice pledged his men's military allegiance to Rome. He stated that service to God superseded all else. He said that to engage in wanton slaughter was inconceivable to Christian soldiers. He and his men refused to worship Roman deities.

Martyrdom
When Maximian ordered them to harass some local Christians, they refused. Ordering the unit to be punished, Maximian had every tenth soldier killed, a military punishment known as decimation. More orders followed, the men refused compliance as encouraged by Maurice, and a second decimation was ordered. In response to the Theban Christians' refusal to attack fellow Christians, Maximian ordered all the remaining members of the legion to be executed. The place in Switzerland where this occurred, known as Agaunum, is now Saint-Maurice, Switzerland, site of the Abbey of St. Maurice.

So reads the earliest account of their martyrdom, contained in the public letter which Bishop Eucherius of Lyon (c. 434–450), addressed to his fellow bishop, Salvius. Alternative versions have the legion refusing Maximian's orders only after discovering innocent Christians had inhabited a town they had just destroyed, or that the emperor had them executed when they refused to sacrifice to the Roman gods.

Legacy

Veneration
Saint Maurice became a patron saint of the German Holy Roman Emperors. In 926, Henry the Fowler (919–936), even ceded the present Swiss canton of Aargau to the abbey, in return for Maurice's lance, sword and spurs. The sword and spurs of Saint Maurice were part of the regalia used at coronations of the Austro-Hungarian emperors until 1916, and among the most important insignia of the imperial throne (although the actual sword dates from the 12th Century). In addition, some of the emperors were anointed before the Altar of Saint Maurice at St. Peter's Basilica. In 929, Henry the Fowler held a royal court gathering (Reichsversammlung) at Magdeburg. At the same time the Mauritius Kloster in honor of Maurice was founded. In 961, Otto I, Holy Roman Emperor, was building and enriching Magdeburg Cathedral, which he intended for his own tomb. To that end,

Maurice is traditionally depicted in full armor, in Italy emblazoned with a red cross. In folk culture he has become connected with the legend of the Holy Lance, which he is supposed to have carried into battle; his name is engraved on the Holy Lance of Vienna, one of several relics claimed as the spear that pierced Jesus' side on the cross. Saint Maurice gives his name to the town St. Moritz as well as to numerous places called Saint-Maurice in French speaking countries. The Indian Ocean island state of Mauritius was named after Maurice, Prince of Orange, and not directly after Maurice himself.

Over 650 religious foundations dedicated to Saint Maurice can be found in France and other European countries. In Switzerland alone, seven churches or altars in Aargau, six in the Canton of Lucerne, four in the Canton of Solothurn, and one in Appenzell Innerrhoden can be found (in fact, his feast day is a cantonal holiday in Appenzell Innerrhoden). Particularly notable among these are the Church and Abbey of Saint-Maurice-en-Valais, the Church of Saint Moritz in the Engadin, and the Monastery Chapel of Einsiedeln Abbey, where his name continues to be greatly revered. Several orders of chivalry were established in his honor as well, including the Order of the Golden Fleece, Order of Saints Maurice and Lazarus, and the Order of Saint Maurice. Additionally, fifty-two towns and villages in France have been named in his honor.

Maurice was also the patron saint of a Catholic parish and church in the 9th Ward of New Orleans and including part of the town of Arabi in St. Bernard Parish. The church was constructed in 1856, but was devastated by the winds and flood waters of Hurricane Katrina on 29 August 2005; the copper-plated steeple was blown off the building. The church was subsequently deconsecrated in 2008, and the local diocese put it up for sale in 2011. By 2014, a local attorney had purchased the property for a local arts organization, after which the building served as both an arts venue and the worship space for a Baptist church that had been displaced following the hurricane.

On 19 July 1941, Pope Pius XII declared Saint Maurice to be patron Saint of the Italian Army's Alpini (mountain infantry corps). The Alpini have celebrated Maurice's feast every year since then.

The Synaxarium of the Coptic Orthodox Church of Alexandria does not mention Saint Maurice, although there are several Coptic churches named for him.

Apparition
The Our Lady of Laus apparitions included an apparition of Saint Maurice.  He appeared in an antique episcopal vestment and told Benoîte Rencurel that he was the one to whom the nearby chapel was dedicated, that he would fetch her some water (before drawing some water out of a well she had not seen), that she should go down to a certain valley to escape the local guard and see the Blessed Virgin Mary, mother of Jesus, and that Mary was both in Heaven and could appear on Earth.

Patronage
Maurice is the patron saint of the Duchy of Savoy (France) and of the Valais (Switzerland) as well as of soldiers, swordsmiths, armies, and infantrymen. In 1591 Charles Emmanuel I, Duke of Savoy arranged the triumphant return of part of the relics of Saint Maurice from the monastery of Agaune in Valais.

He is also the patron saint of weavers and dyers. Manresa (Spain), Piedmont (Italy), Montalbano Jonico (Italy), Schiavi di Abruzzo (Italy), Stadtsulza (Germany) and Coburg (Germany) have chosen St. Maurice as their patron saint as well. St Maurice is also the patron saint of the Brotherhood of Blackheads, a historical military order of unmarried merchants in present-day Estonia and Latvia. In September 2008, certain relics of Maurice were transferred to a new reliquary and rededicated in Schiavi di Abruzzo (Italy).

He is also the patron saint of the town of Coburg in Bavaria, Germany. He is shown there as a man of colour especially on manhole covers as well as on the city coat of arms. There he is called "Coburger Mohr" (engl.: "Coburg Moor").

Portrayal
The earliest surviving work portraying St. Maurice as a dark-complexioned African dates from the 12th century. The oldest surviving image that depicts Saint Maurice as a black African in knight's armor was sculpted in mid-13th century for Magdeburg Cathedral; there it is displayed next to the grave of Otto I, Holy Roman Emperor. Jean Devisse, The Image of the Black in Western Art, laid out the documentary sources for the saint's popularity and documented it with illustrative examples.

When the new cathedral was built under Archbishop Albert II of Käfernberg (served 1205–32), a relic said to be the head of Maurice was procured from the Holy Land.

The image of Saint Maurice has been examined in detail by Gude Suckale-Redlefsen, who demonstrated that this image of Maurice has existed since Maurice's first depiction in Germany between the Weser and the Elbe, and spread to Bohemia, where it became associated with the imperial ambitions of the House of Luxembourg. According to Suckale-Redlefsen, the image of Maurice reached its apogee during the years 1490 to 1530.

Images of the saint died out in the mid-sixteenth century, undermined, Suckale-Redlefsen suggests, by the developing Atlantic slave trade. "Once again, as in the early Middle Ages, the color black had become associated with spiritual darkness and cultural 'otherness'".
There is an oil on wood painting of Maurice by Lucas Cranach the Elder (1472–1553) in the New York Metropolitan Museum of Art.

The city of Coburg's coat of arms honoured the town's patron saint Saint Maurice, since they were granted in 1493. In 1934, the Nazi government forbade any glorification of the "Black" race, and they replaced the coat of arms with one depicting a vertical sword with a Nazi swastika on the pommel. The original coat of arms was restored in 1945 at the end of World War II. Today, the silhouette of Saint Maurice can be found mainly on manhole covers as well as the city coat of arms.

History

There is a difference of opinion among researchers as to whether or not the story of the Theban Legion is based on historical fact, and if so, to what extent. The account by Eucherius of Lyon is classed by Bollandist Hippolyte Delehaye among the historical romances. Donald F. O'Reilly, in Lost Legion Rediscovered, argues that evidence from coins, papyrus, and Roman army lists support the story of the Theban Legion.

Denis Van Berchem, of the University of Geneva, proposed that Eucherius' presentation of the legend of the Theban legion was a literary production, not based on a local tradition. The monastic accounts themselves do not specifically state that all the soldiers were collectively executed;  the twelfth century bishop Otto of Freising wrote in his Chronica de duabus civitatibus that many of the legionaries escaped and only some were executed at Agaunum, though the others were later apprehended and put to death at Galliae Bonna and Colonia Aggripina.

Gallery

See also

 Order of Saints Maurice and Lazarus
 St. Moritz

Notes

External links

 On the image of the Blackamoor in European Heraldry - St. Maurice
 David Wood, "The Origin of the Cult of St. Maurice"
 Saint Maurice from the Golden Legend

287 deaths
3rd-century Christian martyrs
Christian folklore
Egyptian Christian monks
Saints from Roman Egypt
Military saints
Legendary Romans